is an underground metro station located in Kōnan-ku, Yokohama, Kanagawa, Japan operated by the Yokohama Municipal Subway’s Blue Line (Line 1). It is 12.7 kilometers from the terminus of the Blue Line at Shōnandai Station.

History
Kōnan-Chūō Station was opened on September 4, 1976. Platform screen doors were installed in September 2007.

Lines
Yokohama Municipal Subway
Blue Line

Station layout
Kōnan-Chūō Station has two opposed side platforms serving two tracks. The platforms are on the second floor underground, with the exit gates and station building on the first floor underground.

Platforms

References
 Harris, Ken and Clarke, Jackie. Jane's World Railways 2008-2009. Jane's Information Group (2008).

External links
 Kōnan-Chūō Station (Blue Line) 

Railway stations in Kanagawa Prefecture
Railway stations in Japan opened in 1976
Blue Line (Yokohama)